Drypta is a genus of beetles in the family Carabidae, containing the following species:

 Drypta aeneipennis Bates, 1889 
 Drypta aeneipes Wiedemann, 1823 
 Drypta aetheria Andrewes, 1936 
 Drypta allardi Chaudoir, 1877 
 Drypta alluaudi Jeannel, 1949 
 Drypta amabilis Chaudoir, 1852 
 Drypta apicipalpis Fairmaire, 1899 
 Drypta argillacea Andrewes, 1924 
 Drypta australis Dejean, 1825 
 Drypta brevis Peringuey, 1896 
 Drypta caelestis Alluaud, 1935 
 Drypta camerunica Basilewsky, 1960 
 Drypta clarkei Basilewsky, 1984 
 Drypta connecta Chaudoir, 1877 
 Drypta crassiuscula Chaudoir, 1861 
 Drypta cupripennis Jeannel, 1949 
 Drypta cyanea Laporte De Castelnau, 1835 
 Drypta cyanella Chaudoir, 1843 
 Drypta cyanicollis Fairmaire, 1897 
 Drypta cyanopus Andrewes, 1936 
 Drypta dealata Burgeon, 1937 
 Drypta dentata (P.Rossi, 1790) 
 Drypta dilutipes Motschulsky, 1864 
 Drypta distincta (P.Rossi, 1792) 
 Drypta feae Gestro, 1875 
 Drypta flavipes Wiedemann, 1823 
 Drypta formosana Bates, 1873 
 Drypta fulveola Bates, 1883 
 Drypta fumata Fairmaire, 1899 
 Drypta fumigata Putzeys, 1875 
 Drypta iris Laporte De Castelnau, 1840 
 Drypta japonica Bates, 1873 
 Drypta lineola W.S.Macleay, 1825
 Drypta lugens Schmidt-Goebel, 1846 
 Drypta mandibularis Laporte De Castelnau, 1834 
 Drypta mastersii W.S.Macleay, 1871 
 Drypta melanarthra Chaudoir, 1861 
 Drypta microphthalma Jeannel, 1949 
 Drypta minuta Basilewsky, 1960 
 Drypta mira Alluaud, 1935 
 Drypta montisgallorum Jeannel, 1949 
 Drypta mordorata Basilewsky, 1953 
 Drypta mouhoti Chaudoir, 1872 
 Drypta neglecta Basilewsky, 1960 
 Drypta nigricornis Basilewsky, 1960 
 Drypta obscura Schmidt-Goebel, 1846 
 Drypta papua Darlington, 1968 
 Drypta parumpunctata Chaudoir, 1861 
 Drypta perrieri Fairmaire, 1897 
 Drypta posticespinosa (Basilewsky, 1960) 
 Drypta purpurascens Jeannel, 1949 
 Drypta pyriformis Quedenfeldt, 1883 
 Drypta quadrispina Fairmaire, 1897 
 Drypta ruficollis Dejean, 1831 
 Drypta schoutedeni Basilewsky, 1949 
 Drypta semenovi Jedlicka, 1963 
 Drypta setigera Gerstaecker, 1867 
 Drypta seyrigi Jeannel, 1949 
 Drypta siderea Bates, 1892 
 Drypta sulcicollis Putzeys, 1875 
 Drypta tetroxys Jeannel, 1949 
 Drypta thoracica Boheman, 1848 
 Drypta tristis Schmidt-Goebel, 1846 
 Drypta tuberculata Andrewes, 1924
 Drypta ussuriensis Jedlicka, 1963
 Drypta viridicollis Jeannel, 1949 
 Drypta waterhousei Oberthur, 1881

References

Dryptinae
Beetles described in 1796